Edwin Servais (born c. 1958) is an American college baseball coach and small-ball connoisseur, currently the head coach at Creighton University, a member of the Big East Conference in NCAA Division I. He has held the position since July 2003, and has led the Bluejays to four appearances in the NCAA Tournament.

Coaching career

Division III and NAIA
Servais' first college coaching position was with Saint Mary's in Winona, Minnesota, an NCAA Division III program where he was an assistant from 1984 to 1986. Following the 1986 season, he was hired by NAIA member Viterbo to start the school's baseball program. The team went  in 1988, its first season.

Following one season at Viterbo, Servais was rehired by Saint Mary's as head coach. Saint Mary's qualified for the 1993  Division III tournament, and were runner-up in the Midwest Regional. In both 1990 and 1993, Servais was named the Minnesota Intercollegiate Athletic Conference Coach of the Year.

Division I assistant
Prior to the start of the 1996 season, Servais was hired as an assistant coach at Iowa State of the Big 12 Conference, his first Division I coaching position. He served as an assistant to head coach Lyle Smith for two seasons 

From 1998–2003, Servais was an assistant and infield coach at Creighton under head coach Jack Dahm. While he was an assistant, Creighton appeared in two NCAA Tournaments (1999 and 2000).

Creighton

Missouri Valley Conference
After a 20–37 season in 2003, Dahm resigned as Creighton's head coach in late June. Servais was named interim head coach and later hired as the program's head coach on July 29.

In Servais' first season in 2004, Creighton went  and finished second in the Missouri Valley Conference (MVC), after finishing fifth the previous season. Servais was named the MVC Coach of the Year and became the first first-year coach to receive the award. In 2005, the team went 48–17 and won the MVC regular season championship.  After losing the MVC Tournament championship game to Wichita State, Creighton received an at-large bid to the NCAA Tournament.  In the tournament, the team went 2–2 and lost in the Lincoln Regional final to Nebraska. Servais was again named MVC Coach of the Year.

Creighton finished fourth in the MVC in 2006, but qualified for a second NCAA Tournament under Servais in 2007. It received the MVC's automatic bid to the tournament by defeating Wichita State in the MVC championship game, 10–9 in 12 innings. As the second seed in the Fayetteville Regional, it went 1–2. Servais was named the MVC Coach of the Year.

The program's win totals declined from 2007–2010. After finishing second in the MVC in 2007, it finished third in 2008, fourth in 2009, and sixth in 2010.  In 2011 and 2012, however, Creighton appeared in consecutive NCAA Tournaments. In 2011, the team won both the MVC regular season and tournament titles and was named the second seed in the Corvallis Regional. It defeated Georgia, 2–1, in its opening game, but lost consecutive games to Oregon State and Georgia and was eliminated. For the season, Servais received his fourth MVC Coach of the Year award. In 2012, the Bluejays finished last in the MVC, but won the conference tournament to qualify for the NCAA Tournament.  As the fourth seed in the Los Angeles Regional, Creighton lost to UCLA in the regional final.

In 2013, Creighton's final season in the MVC, the team finished third in the conference.

Big East Conference
Creighton joined the new Big East Conference ahead of the 2014 season.  The Bluejays won the inaugural regular season title, then lost to Xavier in the tournament championship game.  Servais was named the Big East Coach of the Year.

Personal life
Servais is the uncle of current Seattle Mariners manager Scott Servais (b.1967), a former major league catcher who played at Creighton in the late 1980s.

Head coaching record
The following is a table of Servais' yearly records as an NAIA and NCAA head baseball coach.

See also
 List of current NCAA Division I baseball coaches

Notes

References

External links
 Creighton profile

Living people
Year of birth missing (living people)
Creighton Bluejays baseball coaches
High school baseball coaches in the United States
Iowa State Cyclones baseball coaches
Saint Mary's Cardinals baseball coaches
Viterbo Hawks baseball coaches
Wisconsin–La Crosse Eagles baseball players
Baseball players from Wisconsin
Sportspeople from La Crosse, Wisconsin
Aquinas High School (La Crosse, Wisconsin) alumni